Alberto Massimino (5 January 1895 – 27 November 1975) was an Italian automotive engineer.

Biography
Born in Turin, he studied mechanical engineering in Switzerland and worked for FIAT (1924–28), where he followed Vittorio Jano who had left for Alfa Romeo.  The 1500 cc, 12-cylinder 806/504 was driven by Pietro Bordino in the Gran Premio di Milano (1927).  He also had a short stay at Alfa Romeo and Stabilimenti Farina before joining Scuderia Ferrari (1938–44), working on the 158 Alfetta with Gioacchino Colombo, as well as on the 
Tipo 815 (1940 Mille Miglia).
At Maserati (1944–52) he was involved in the Maserati 4CLT, 
Maserati A6 (1946) and Maserati 250F (1952).  He then worked for on shorter projects for
Ferrari (the Jano V12 and Dino), Stanguellini, De Tomaso, Moretti and Scuderia Serenissima.

Massiminimo died at Modena in 1975.

References

External links
Ferrari designers
grandprix.com

Automotive engineers from Turin
Ferrari people
Formula One designers
Maserati people
Italian motorsport people
1895 births
1975 deaths
Italian expatriates in Switzerland